Surendra Singh Patel is an Indian politician from Uttar Pradesh. He is a Member of the Legislative Assembly from Sevapuri constituency seat in Varanasi. Patel was appointed state minister of public works and irrigation department in the present government of Uttar Pradesh.

See also

Sixteenth Legislative Assembly of Uttar Pradesh

References

Year of birth missing (living people)
Living people
Uttar Pradesh MLAs 2007–2012
People from Varanasi district
Apna Dal politicians
Samajwadi Party politicians
Samajwadi Party politicians from Uttar Pradesh